First Time Female Director is an upcoming American film directed, written and produced by Chelsea Peretti. The film will star Peretti, Blake Anderson, Kate Berlant, Megan Mullally, Benito Skinner, Megan Stalter, Jak Knight, Max Greenfield, and Amy Poehler.

Cast
 Chelsea Peretti
 Blake Anderson
 Kate Berlant
 Megan Mullally
 Benito Skinner
 Megan Stalter
 Jak Knight
 Max Greenfield
 Brad Hall
 Tim Heidecker
 Natasha Leggero
 Amy Poehler
 Andy Richter
 Xosha Roquemore
 Numa Perrier

Production
In July 2022, it was announced that Chelsea Peretti would make her feature directorial debut for the film First Time Female Director, and also star, write, and produce alongside Amy Poehler, Kate Arend, and Jordan Grief for Paper Kite Productions, and Deanna Barillari. Production companies involved include Paper Kite Productions, MarVista Entertainment, and Fox Entertainment.

The film wrapped principal photography in Los Angeles, California, in July 2022.

References

External links
 

Films shot in Los Angeles
Upcoming directorial debut films